Lodgepole is a hamlet in central Alberta, Canada within Brazeau County.

History 
The Town of Lodgepole was established on July 1, 1956, and had a population of 508 by 1961. The population declined to 207 by 1966. The town was dissolved in 1970, becoming a hamlet.

On October 17, 1982, a sour gas well AMOCO DOME BRAZEAU RIVER 13-12-48-12, being drilled 20 km west of Lodgepole, blew out. The burning well was finally capped 67 days later by the Texas well-control company, Boots & Coots.

Demographics 

See also 
List of communities in Alberta
List of designated places in Alberta
List of former urban municipalities in Alberta
List of hamlets in Alberta

References 

Brazeau County
Hamlets in Alberta
Former new towns in Alberta
Designated places in Alberta
Populated places disestablished in 1970